Yoxall is a civil parish in the district of East Staffordshire, Staffordshire, England.  It contains 66 buildings that are recorded in the National Heritage List for England.  Of these, three are listed at Grade II*, the middle grade, and the others are at Grade II, the lowest grade.  The parish contains the village of Yoxall and the surrounding countryside.  Most of the buildings are houses, cottages, farmhouses and farm buildings, a high proportion of which are timber framed or have timber-framed cores, and many of these are within the village.  The other listed buildings include churches and associated structures, former watermills, bridges, mileposts, and a public house.


Key

Buildings

References

Citations

Sources

Lists of listed buildings in Staffordshire